James N. Gamble Montessori High School (less formally known as Gamble Montessori) is a public high school in Cincinnati, Ohio, United States. It is part of the Cincinnati Public Schools district, one of two Montessori high schools.

History
Increasing demand for secondary Montessori education in the city prompted the creation of this program, the second Montessori public junior high/high school in Cincinnati Public Schools, in 2005.  Beginning with a 7th grade class, the school expanded by one grade level every year and now serves grades 7-12.  Gamble Montessori's first class of seniors graduated in May, 2011.

The program was originally housed in the Dater Montessori Elementary School building, before moving to the Jacobs Center in the fall of 2007, when it was renamed Westside Montessori High School.  In early 2010 the school’s LSDMC (Local School Decision-Making Committee) voted to change the school’s name to James N. Gamble Montessori High School, and the school board approved this name change on March 29, 2010.

Gamble Montessori is currently located in Westwood at the original building. On April 30, 2012, the CPS Board of Education approved taking out a $26.8 million loan for green renovations of several schools, including $6.9 million for Gamble Montessori.

James N. Gamble
James N. Gamble (1836-1932) is remembered as a significant civic benefactor in Cincinnati.  The son of James Gamble, one of the founders of Procter & Gamble, James N. Gamble is credited with developing Ivory Soap for the company.  James N. Gamble lived in Westwood for sixty years, and was the last mayor of the Village of Westwood before it was annexed by the city of Cincinnati.  Among his many accomplishments in Westwood and Cincinnati:  he helped create the charitable organization now known as the United Way, helped found the YMCA of Cincinnati, was a major benefactor of the Christ Hospital, was a sponsor of the Freedmen's Aid Society (to provide education to freed slaves after the Civil War), and donated the funds to finish construction of a new football stadium at the University of Cincinnati (Nippert Stadium) named in memory of his grandson.

Program
The Gamble Montessori program is based on Maria Montessori’s “erdkinder” philosophy and on the school’s five core values of community, hard work, learning, respect, and peace.  Students, parents, and teachers work together toward the goals of learning and achieving.

All students are required to make a serious commitment to serving others in the school and community through volunteer work.  Each high school student must complete 200 community service hours (50 hours per year) in order to receive a Gamble Montessori High School diploma.  Junior high students are required to log 36 service hours per year. Some examples of service work are volunteering as summer camp counselors, working with People Working Cooperatively, tutoring other students, and completing service projects within city parks.

Students are also expected to take some of the responsibility for fundraising and/or earning money to pay for their extensive field experiences and intersessions.  Gamble Montessori offers many fundraising opportunities throughout the school year for students and parents.

Junior high students are grouped into “communities,” groups of approximately 50 students (a combination of 7th and 8th graders) that share two teachers (one for Language Arts/Social Studies, and the other for Math/Science) and an instructional assistant. The 8th graders are considered the community leaders and help the 7th graders learn the expectations and workings of  junior high.  By the end of the school year, 7th graders attend leadership camp in order to become the leaders of the next year’s community, while the 8th graders complete their junior high experience with a marine biology study in the Florida Keys.

For high school students, four years of rigorous academic core classes are required; students also choose elective courses from a list ranging from fine arts to environmental science to ethnic studies. In addition, all high school students participate in intensive, academically rigorous field experiences called intersessions twice yearly, mid-semester. In the spring students may choose from areas of study that include a wide variety of topics, from studying urban planning, infrastructure within Cincinnati to exploring the biodiversity of the Great Smoky Mountains and the history of Washington, D.C. In the fall students attend intersessions based on their class—for example, juniors focus on college preparation and take a college tour, while seniors participate in a career internship intersession.

Seniors also must complete a year-long research project that helps students develop time-management skills, research a topic of choice with a qualified mentor, and learn to utilize a university library. The accomplishment of this capstone project generally requires Saturday morning and after-school help sessions.  The senior project culminates in a lengthy research paper on the subject, along with a presentation of the student’s research to teachers, peers, and parents.

External links

References

Cincinnati Public Schools
Montessori schools in the United States
High schools in Hamilton County, Ohio
Public high schools in Ohio
Public middle schools in Ohio
Educational institutions established in 2005
2005 establishments in Ohio
Westwood, Cincinnati